

Films

References

Films
2009
2009-related lists